Coussey is a commune in the Vosges department in Grand Est in northeastern France.

Sights
The twelfth-century church of Notre Dame (Our Lady) has a romanesque exterior while the interior is primarily in the Gothic style.
Coussey the origins of the Coussey family.

Personalities
Sir James Henley Coussey, who chaired the Coussey Constitutional Committee set up in December 1949 to draw up a new Constitution for the Gold Coast.

See also
Communes of the Vosges department

References

Communes of Vosges (department)